Ballan railway station is located on the Serviceton line in Victoria, Australia. It serves the town of Ballan, and it opened on 22 December 1886.

History

Ballan station opened on 22 December 1886 as the terminus of a short line from Ballarat. On 4 December 1889, the line was extended to Bacchus Marsh, meaning that trains could then operate from Melbourne to Ballarat via Ballan. Before the line via Ballan and Bacchus Marsh was constructed, Ballarat was only indirectly linked to Melbourne via the Melbourne-Geelong and Geelong-Ballarat lines.

Being on a single track section, the station served as a crossing loop, with an interlocked signal box erected in 1890. In 1893, a turntable was added and, by 1908, the station had a four road yard, a passenger platform, a goods shed and goods platform.

By 1967, the turntable was removed. In early 1973, a dead-end siding at the Up (Spencer Street) end of the station was abolished. During 1987 and 1988, more tracks in the yard were abolished, leaving only the platform road and a loop remaining. In 1996, the loop was abolished and the signal box closed, meaning that Ballan was no longer available for the crossing of trains.

In 2004, as part of the Regional Fast Rail project, the track at the eastern end of the station was realigned in order to permit an increase in the maximum speeds of trains though the curve. In 2006, the station itself was refurbished, and included an upgrade to the waiting room, new toilets, resurfacing of the platform and new fencing and lighting.

The Victorian State Government's Regional Rail Revival project in 2019 included an additional track and platform at Ballan, which delivered two side platforms, an accessible pedestrian overpass and improved parking. By January 2021, most of these works were completed.

Closed stations Ingliston and Rowsley were located between Ballan and Bacchus Marsh. Between Ballan and Ballarat, closed stations include Gordon, Millbrook, Wallace, Bungaree, Warrenheip and Ballarat East.

Platforms and services

Ballan has two side platforms. It is serviced by V/Line Ballarat and Ararat line services.

Platform 1:
  services to Wendouree and Southern Cross
  services to Ararat and Southern Cross

Platform 2  
  services to Wendouree and Southern Cross
  services to Ararat and Southern Cross

Transport links

Bacchus Marsh Coaches operates two routes via Ballan station, under contract to Public Transport Victoria:
 to Hepburn
 Ballan – Mount Egerton

V/Line also operates a road coach via Ballan station to Melbourne and Ballarat.

References

External links
 
 Victorian Railway Stations gallery
 Melway map at street-directory.com.au

Railway stations in Australia opened in 1887
Regional railway stations in Victoria (Australia)
Shire of Moorabool